WREZ (105.5 FM, "105.5 The CAT") is a radio station licensed to the community of Metropolis, Illinois, United States, and serving the Paducah, Kentucky, area.  The station plays a Top 40 (CHR) format. WREZ is owned by Withers Broadcasting.

Notable programming includes the syndicated morning show "The Kidd Kraddick Morning Show", "Backtrax USA" and the "American Top 40 with Ryan Seacrest".

External links
 WREZ official website
  
 105.5 The Cat at MySpace

REZ
Contemporary hit radio stations in the United States
Companies based in Massac County, Illinois